The Oakland Athletics' 2006 season was their 39th in Oakland, California. It was also the 106th season in franchise history. The team finished first in the American League West with a record of 93-69.

The Athletics won their division (and reached the postseason) for the first time since 2003. The team was led, in large part, by eventual Hall-of-Famer Frank Thomas. Thomas, who was signed to a one-year contract in the offseason, hit a team-high 39 home runs over the course of the season. He ultimately finished fourth in American League MVP voting.

The Athletics managed to sweep the Minnesota Twins in the first round of the playoffs. In doing so, they advanced to the American League Championship Series for the first time since 1992. The sweep was Oakland's first playoff series victory since 1990. It stood as the only playoff series victory during  the Billy Beane era until 2020. The Athletics would themselves be swept, 4 games to 0, by the Detroit Tigers in the ALCS.

The team saw a number of key departures at the end of the season. Free agent pitcher Barry Zito, the team's lone All-Star in 2006, signed with the rival San Francisco Giants following the team's ALCS loss. Additionally, Frank Thomas signed a two-year deal with the Toronto Blue Jays. The coaching staff experienced similar turnover, as manager Ken Macha and longtime third base coach Ron Washington departed. Macha was fired at seasons' end; Washington, by contrast, was hired to manage the division rival Texas Rangers. They would be replaced by Bob Geren and Rene Lachemann, respectively.

Offseason
November 29, 2005: Esteban Loaiza was signed as a free agent with the Oakland Athletics.
December 9, 2005: Scott McClain was signed as a free agent with the Oakland Athletics.
December 13, 2005: Milton Bradley was traded by the Los Angeles Dodgers with Antonio Perez to the Oakland Athletics for Andre Ethier.
January 31, 2006: Frank Thomas signed as a free agent.

Regular season

Season standings

Record vs. opponents

Game log

|- style="background-color:#ffbbbb"
| 1 || April 3 || Yankees || 2-15 || Johnson (1-0) || Zito (0-1) || – || 35,077 || 0-1
|- style="background-color:#bbffbb"
| 2 || April 4 || Yankees || 4-3 || Street (1-0) || Proctor (0-1) || – || 31,284 || 1-1
|- style="background-color:#bbffbb"
| 3 || April 5 || Yankees || 9-4 || Kennedy (1-0) || Wright (0-1) || – || 30,165 || 2-1
|- style="background-color:#ffbbbb"
| 4 || April 6 || @ Mariners || 2-6 || Meche (1-0) || Loaiza (0-1) || Putz (1) || 22,701 || 2-2
|- style="background-color:#bbffbb"
| 5 || April 7 || @ Mariners || 5-0 || Blanton (1-0) || Hernández (0-1) || – || 30,612 || 3-2
|- style="background-color:#bbffbb"
| 6 || April 8 || @ Mariners || 3-0 || Zito (1-1) || Moyer (0-1) || Street (1) || 37,904 || 4-2
|- style="background-color:#bbffbb"
| 7 || April 9 || @ Mariners || 6-4 || Harden (1-0) || Piñeiro (1-1) || Street (2) || 27,139 || 5-2
|- style="background-color:#ffbbbb"
| 8 || April 11 || @ Twins || 6-7 || Radke (2-0) || Haren (0-1) || Nathan (1) || 48,911 || 5-3
|- style="background-color:#ffbbbb"
| 9 || April 12 || @ Twins || 5-6 || Silva (1-1) || Loaiza (0-2) || Nathan (2) || 22,603 || 5-4
|- style="background-color:#ffbbbb"
| 10 || April 13 || @ Twins || 2-8 || Lohse (1-1) || Blanton (1-1) || – || 13,520 || 5-5
|- style="background-color:#ffbbbb"
| 11 || April 14 || Rangers || 3-6 || Millwood (1-2) || Zito (1-2) || – || 14,049 || 5-6
|- style="background-color:#bbffbb"
| 12 || April 15 || Rangers || 5-4 || Harden (2-0) || Padilla (2-1) || Street (3) || 16,186 || 6-6
|- style="background-color:#ffbbbb"
| 13 || April 16 || Rangers || 3-5 || Cordero (1-1) || Street (1-1) || – || 21,256 || 6-7
|- style="background-color:#bbffbb"
| 14 || April 18 || Tigers || 4-3 || Duchscherer (1-0) || Verlander (1-2) || Street (4) || 16,857 || 7-7
|- style="background-color:#ffbbbb"
| 15 || April 19 || Tigers || 4-11 || Rogers (3-1) || Blanton (1-2) || – || 18,309 || 7-8
|- style="background-color:#ffbbbb"
| 16 || April 20 || Tigers || 3-4 || Rodney (1-0) || Duchscherer (1-1) || – || 15,489 || 7-9
|- style="background-color:#bbffbb"
| 17 || April 21 || Angels || 5-3 || Harden (3-0) || Romero (1-2) || Calero (1) || 19,874 || 8-9
|- style="background-color:#ffbbbb"
| 18 || April 22 || Angels || 4-5 || Weaver (1-2) || Haren (0-2) || F. Rodríguez (6) || 22,670 || 8-10
|- style="background-color:#ffbbbb"
| 19 || April 23 || Angels || 3-4 || Escobar (3-1) || Loaiza (0-3) || F. Rodríguez (7) || 27,104 || 8-11
|- style="background-color:#bbffbb"
| 20 || April 24 || @ Rangers || 3-2 || Blanton (2-2) || Wilson (1-1) || Duchscherer (1) || 23,802 || 9-11
|- style="background-color:#ffbbbb"
| 21 || April 25 || @ Rangers || 5-6 || Cordero (3-2) || Gaudin (0-1) || – || 25,492 || 9-12
|- style="background-color:#bbffbb"
| 22 || April 26 || @ Rangers || 6-4 (10) || Duchscherer (2-1) || Wilson (1-2) || Kennedy (1) || 23,756 || 10-12
|- style="background-color:#bbffbb"
| 23 || April 28 || @ Royals || 5-3 || Haren (1-2) || Mays (0-3) || Saarloos (1) || 12,203 || 11-12
|- style="background-color:#bbbbbb"
| --- || April 29|| @ Royals || colspan=5|Postponed (rain)  || 11-12
|- style="background-color:#bbffbb"
| 24 || April 30 || @ Royals || 13-6 || Blanton (3-2) || Hudson (0-3) || – || 15,224 || 12-12

|- style="background-color:#bbffbb"
| 25 || May 1 || @ Angels || 1-0 || Zito (2-2) || Carrasco (0-2)|| Duchscherer (2) || 41,721 || 13-12
|- style="background-color:#bbffbb"
| 26 || May 2 || @ Angels || 10-3 || Halsey (1-0) || Lackey (3-2)|| – || 35,943 || 14-12
|- style="background-color:#ffbbbb"
| 27 || May 3 || Indians || 3-14 || Byrd (4-2) || Haren (1-3) || – || 18,248 || 14-13
|- style="background-color:#bbffbb"
| 28 || May 4 || Indians || 12-4 || Saarloos (1-0) || Johnson (2-2) || Gaudin (1) || 14,695 || 15-13
|- style="background-color:#ffbbbb"
| 29 || May 5 || Devil Rays || 1-3 || Kazmir (4-2) || Blanton (3-3) || Walker (2) || 12,552 || 15-14
|- style="background-color:#bbffbb"
| 30 || May 6 || Devil Rays || 3-2 || Kennedy (2-0) || Orvella (1-3) || – || 25,080 || 16-14
|- style="background-color:#ffbbbb"
| 31 || May 7 || Devil Rays || 2-3 || Hendrickson (2-2) || Halsey (1-1) || Walker (3) || 22,837 || 16-15
|- style="background-color:#bbffbb"
| 32 || May 9 || @ Blue Jays || 6-5 || Haren (2-3) || Towers (0-7) || Street (5) || 36,269 || 17-15
|- style="background-color:#ffbbbb"
| 33 || May 10 || @ Blue Jays || 7-9 || Rosario (1-0) || Blanton (3-4) || Ryan (8) || 19,269 || 17-16
|- style="background-color:#ffbbbb"
| 34 || May 11 || @ Blue Jays || 3-8 || Lilly (4-2) || Saarloos (1-1) || – || 23,974 || 17-17
|- style="background-color:#ffbbbb"
| 35 || May 12 || @ Yankees || 0-2 || Wang (3-1) || Zito (2-3) || Rivera (7) || 47,497 || 17-18
|- style="background-color:#ffbbbb"
| 36 || May 13 || @ Yankees || 3-4 || Wright (1-2) || Halsey (1-2) || Farnsworth (1) || 53,907 || 17-19
|- style="background-color:#bbffbb"
| 37 || May 14 || @ Yankees || 6-1 || Haren (3-3) || Johnson (5-4) || – || 52,587 || 18-19
|- style="background-color:#bbffbb"
| 38 || May 16 || Mariners || 12-6 || Blanton (4-4) || Hernández (3-5) || – || 16,397 || 19-19
|- style="background-color:#bbffbb"
| 39 || May 17 || Mariners || 7-2 || Zito (3-3) || Moyer (1-4) || – || 19,208 || 20-19
|- style="background-color:#bbffbb"
| 40 || May 18 || Mariners || 6-3 || Saarloos (2-1) || Piñeiro (4-4) || Street (6) || 18,136 || 21-19
|- style="background-color:#bbffbb"
| 41 || May 19 || Giants || 1-0 || Haren (4-3) || Lowry (1-1) || Street (7) || 35,077 || 22-19
|- style="background-color:#ffbbbb"
| 42 || May 20 || Giants || 2-4 (10) || Benítez (3-0) || Calero (0-1) || – || 35,077 || 22-20
|- style="background-color:#ffbbbb"
| 43 || May 21 || Giants || 0-6 || Cain (2-5) || Blanton (4-5) || – || 35,077 || 22-21
|- style="background-color:#ffbbbb"
| 44 || May 22 || @ White Sox || 4-5 (10) || Jenks (2-1) || Flores (0-1) || – || 39,354 || 22-22
|- style="background-color:#ffbbbb"
| 45 || May 23 || @ White Sox || 3-9 || Vázquez (5-3) || Saarloos (2-2) || – || 38,860 || 22-23
|- style="background-color:#ffbbbb"
| 46 || May 24 || @ White Sox || 2-3 || Buehrle (6-2) || Haren (4-4) || Jenks (13) || 38,434 || 22-24
|- style="background-color:#ffbbbb"
| 47 || May 25 || @ Rangers || 7-8 || Otsuka (1-1) || Street (1-2) || – || 22,006 || 22-25
|- style="background-color:#ffbbbb"
| 48 || May 26 || @ Rangers || 3-5 || Cordero (4-3) || Gaudin (0-2) || Otsuka (7) || 27,791 || 22-26
|- style="background-color:#bbffbb"
| 49 || May 27 || @ Rangers || 6-3 || Zito (4-3) || Loe (3-5) || Street (8) || 41,226 || 23-26
|- style="background-color:#ffbbbb"
| 50 || May 28 || @ Rangers || 3-4 || Padilla (5-3) || Saarloos (2-3) || Otsuka (8) || 38,905 || 23-27
|- style="background-color:#ffbbbb"
| 51 || May 29 || Royals || 4-6 || Etherton (1-0) || Haren (4-5) || Burgos (6) || 28,040 || 23-28
|- style="background-color:#ffbbbb"
| 52 || May 30 || Royals || 7-8 (10) || Dessens (3-5) || Roney (0-1) || Burgos (7) || 12,516 || 23-29
|- style="background-color:#bbffbb"
| 53 || May 31 || Royals || 7-0 || Blanton (5-5) || Elarton (1-6) || – || 25,181 || 24-29

|- style="background-color:#bbffbb"
| 54 || June 1 || Twins || 4-0 || Zito (5-3) || Bonser (1-1) || – || 12,025 || 25-29
|- style="background-color:#ffbbbb"
| 55 || June 2 || Twins || 1-2 || Santana (5-4) || Saarloos (2-4) || Nathan (7) || 16,138 || 25-30
|- style="background-color:#bbffbb"
| 56 || June 3 || Twins || 2-1 || Halsey (2-2) || Radke (4-7) || Street (9) || 23,194 || 26-30
|- style="background-color:#bbffbb"
| 57 || June 4 || Twins || 5-1 || Halsey (3-2) || Silva (2-7) || – || 25,247 || 27-30
|- style="background-color:#bbffbb"
| 58 || June 6 || @ Indians || 7-6 || Zito (6-3) || Betancourt (0-1) || Street (10) || 17,340 || 28-30
|- style="background-color:#ffbbbb"
| 59 || June 7 || @ Indians || 2-11 || Byrd (5-4) || Blanton (5-6) || – || 20,311 || 28-31
|- style="background-color:#bbffbb"
| 60 || June 8 || @ Indians || 4-1 || Loaiza (1-3) || Johnson (3-6) || Street (11) || 21,099 || 29-31
|- style="background-color:#bbffbb"
| 61 || June 9 || @ Yankees || 6-5 || Haren (5-5) || Johnson (7-5) || Street (12) || 53,837 || 30-31
|- style="background-color:#bbffbb"
| 62 || June 10 || @ Yankees || 5-2 || Saarloos (3-4) || Mussina (8-2) || Street (13) || 53,779 || 31-31
|- style="background-color:#bbffbb"
| 63 || June 11 || @ Yankees || 6-5 || Zito (7-3) || Kyle Farnsworth (2-4) || Street (14) || 54,570 || 32-31
|- style="background-color:#bbffbb"
| 64 || June 13 || Mariners || 2-0 || Blanton (6-6) || Moyer (3-6) || Street (15) || 15,216 || 33-31
|- style="background-color:#bbffbb"
| 65 || June 14 || Mariners || 7-2 || Haren (6-5) || Piñeiro (5-7) || – || 20,550 || 34-31
|- style="background-color:#bbffbb"
| 66 || June 15 || Mariners || 9-6 || Loaiza (2-3) || Washburn (4-8) || Street (16) || 16,563 || 35-31
|- style="background-color:#bbffbb"
| 67 || June 16 || Dodgers || 7-3 || Zito (8-3) || Tomko (5-6) || – || 30,161 || 36-31
|- style="background-color:#bbffbb"
| 68 || June 17 || Dodgers || 5-4 (17) || Karsay (1-0) || Seo (2-4) || – || 35,077 || 37-31
|- style="background-color:#bbffbb"
| 69 || June 18 || Dodgers || 5-2 || Blanton (7-6) || Sele (3-2) || Street (17) || 35,077 || 38-31
|- style="background-color:#ffbbbb"
| 70 || June 19 || @ Rockies || 0-7 || Kim (4-4) || Haren (6-6) || – || 21,964 || 38-32
|- style="background-color:#ffbbbb"
| 71 || June 20 || @ Rockies || 0-6 || Jennings (6-6) || Loaiza (2-4) || – || 21,753 || 38-33
|- style="background-color:#bbffbb"
| 72 || June 21 || @ Rockies || 3-2 (11) || Calero (1-1) || King (1-3) || – || 26,489 || 39-33
|- style="background-color:#bbffbb"
| 73 || June 23 || @ Giants || 4-3 || Calero (2-1) || Benítez (4-1) || Street (18) || 42,948 || 40-33
|- style="background-color:#ffbbbb"
| 74 || June 24 || @ Giants || 7-8 || Worrell (3-2) || Street (1-3) || – || 42,866 || 40-34
|- style="background-color:#bbffbb"
| 75 || June 25 || @ Giants || 10-4 || Loaiza (3-4) || Cain (6-6) || – || 42,414 || 41-34
|- style="background-color:#ffbbbb"
| 76 || June 27 || @ Padres || 0-3 || Young (7-3) || Zito (8-4) || Hoffman (19) || 34,102 || 41-35
|- style="background-color:#ffbbbb"
| 77 || June 28 || @ Padres || 1-8 || Hensley (5-6) || Blanton (7-7) || – || 39,874 || 41-36
|- style="background-color:#bbffbb"
| 78 || June 29 || @ Padres || 6-5 (14) || Flores (1-1) || Cassidy (4-4) || Gaudin (2) || 30,301 || 42-36
|- style="background-color:#ffbbbb"
| 79 || June 30 || Diamondbacks || 4-6 || Vargas (7-4) || Halsey (3-3) || Julio (7) || 16,756 || 42-37

|- style="background-color:#ffbbbb"
| 80 || July 1 || Diamondbacks || 2-7 || Batista (8-5) || Loaiza (3-5) || – || 19,024 || 42-38
|- style="background-color:#ffbbbb"
| 81 || July 2 || Diamondbacks || 1-3 || Webb (9-3) || Zito (8-5) || – || 19,130 || 42-39
|- style="background-color:#bbffbb"
| 82 || July 3 || Tigers || 5-3 || Blanton (8-7) || Robertson (8-4) || Street (19) || 35,077 || 43-39
|- style="background-color:#bbffbb"
| 83 || July 4 || Tigers || 2-1 (10) || Gaudin (1-2) || Rodney (4-3) || – || 21,096 || 44-39
|- style="background-color:#ffbbbb"
| 84 || July 5 || Tigers || 4-10 || Rogers (11-3) || Saarloos (3-5) || Colón (1) || 22,210 || 44-40
|- style="background-color:#bbffbb"
| 85 || July 6 || Angels || 7-5 || Street (2-3) || Shields (4-6) || – || 14,673 || 45-40
|- style="background-color:#ffbbbb"
| 86 || July 7 || Angels || 0-3 || Lackey (7-5) || Zito (8-6) || – || 20,711 || 45-41
|- style="background-color:#ffbbbb"
| 87 || July 8 || Angels || 4-6 || Weaver (6-0) || Blanton (8-8) || F. Rodríguez (20) || 25,289 || 45-42
|- style="background-color:#ffbbbb"
| 88 || July 9 || Angels || 2-4 || Santana (10-3) || Haren (6-7) || F. Rodríguez (21) || 26,603 || 45-43
|- style="background-color:#bbffbb"
| 89 || July 13 || @ Red Sox || 5-4 (11) || Street (3-3) || Tavárez (1-3) || Saarloos (2) || 36,141 || 46-43
|- style="background-color:#bbffbb"
| 90 || July 14 || @ Red Sox || 15-3 || Zito (9-6) || Beckett (11-5) || – || 36,319 || 47-43
|- style="background-color:#ffbbbb"
| 91 || July 15 || @ Red Sox || 0-7 || Schilling (11-3) || Haren (6-8) || – || 36,232 || 47-44
|- style="background-color:#bbffbb"
| 92 || July 16 || @ Red Sox || 8-1 || Blanton (9-8) || Snyder (1-1) || – || 35,643 || 48-44
|- style="background-color:#ffbbbb"
| 93 || July 17 || @ Orioles || 3-5 || Birkins (5-1) || Saarloos (3-6) || Ray (23) || 19,652 || 48-45
|- style="background-color:#bbffbb"
| 94 || July 18 || @ Orioles || 5-4 || Loaiza (4-5) || E. Rodríguez (0-1) || Street (20) || 20,827 || 49-45
|- style="background-color:#bbffbb"
| 95 || July 19 || @ Orioles || 5-1 || Zito (10-6) || Benson (9-9) || – || 29,407 || 50-45
|- style="background-color:#ffbbbb"
| 96 || July 21 || @ Tigers || 4-7 || Verlander (12-4) || Haren (6-9) || – || 40,687 || 50-46
|- style="background-color:#bbffbb"
| 97 || July 22 || @ Tigers || 9-5 || Blanton (10-8) || Ledezma (1-1) || – || 38,923 || 51-46
|- style="background-color:#ffbbbb"
| 98 || July 23 || @ Tigers || 4-8 || Robertson (9-6) || Loaiza (4-6) || – || 40,355 || 51-47
|- style="background-color:#ffbbbb"
| 99 || July 24 || Red Sox || 3-7 || Beckett (13-5) || Zito (10-7) || – || 33,370 || 51-48
|- style="background-color:#ffbbbb"
| 100 || July 25 || Red Sox || 5-13 || Schilling (13-3) || Windsor (0-1) || – || 34,077 || 51-49
|- style="background-color:#bbffbb"
| 101 || July 26 || Red Sox || 5-1 || Haren (7-9) || Snyder (2-2) || – || 35,077 || 52-49
|- style="background-color:#bbffbb"
| 102 || July 27 || Blue Jays || 5-2 || Blanton (11-8) || Lilly (9-9) || Street (21) || 19,251 || 53-49
|- style="background-color:#ffbbbb"
| 103 || July 28 || Blue Jays || 3-4 || Downs (5-1) || Loaiza (4-7) || Ryan (25) || 22,217 || 53-50
|- style="background-color:#bbffbb"
| 104 || July 29 || Blue Jays || 7-4 || Zito (11-7) || McGowan (1-1) || Street (22) || 25,627 || 54-50
|- style="background-color:#bbffbb"
| 105 || July 30 || Blue Jays || 6-5 || Street (4-3) || Ryan (1-1) || – || 29,709 || 55-50
|- style="background-color:#bbffbb"
| 106 || July 31 || @ Angels || 3-1 || Haren (8-9) || Santana (11-5) || – || 43,558 || 56-50

|- style="background-color:#ffbbbb"
| 107 || August 1 || @ Angels || 2-3 || Saunders (2-0) || Blanton (11-9) || F. Rodríguez (26) || 44,111 || 55-51
|- style="background-color:#bbffbb"
| 108 || August 2 || @ Angels || 3-2 || Calero || Shields (6-7) || Street (23) || 44,149 || 57-51
|- style="background-color:#bbffbb"
| 109 || August 4 || @ Mariners || 5-2 || Zito (12-7) || Washburn (5-11) || – || 44,277 || 58-51
|- style="background-color:#bbffbb"
| 110 || August 5 || @ Mariners || 5-2 || Haren (9-9) || Piñeiro (7-9) || Street (24) || 40,115 || 59-51
|- style="background-color:#bbffbb"
| 111 || August 6 || @ Mariners || 7-6 || Blanton (12-9) || Meche (9-6) || Street (25) || 37,437 || 60-51
|- style="background-color:#bbffbb"
| 112 || August 7 || Rangers || 7-4 || Loaiza (5-7) || Vólquez (0-1) || Calero (2) || 21,208 || 61-51
|- style="background-color:#bbffbb"
| 113 || August 8 || Rangers || 7-6 || Saarloos (4-6) || Millwood (10-8) || Street (26) || 21,650 || 62-51
|- style="background-color:#ffbbbb"
| 114 || August 9 || Rangers || 0-14 || Padilla (12-7) || Zito (12-8) || – || 30,127 || 62-52
|- style="background-color:#bbffbb"
| 115 || August 11 || Devil Rays || 5-2 || Haren (10-9) || Kazmir (10-8) || Street (27) || 20,758 || 63-52
|- style="background-color:#bbffbb"
| 116 || August 12 || Devil Rays || 6-3 || Blanton (13-9) || Fossum (6-5) || Street (28) || 26,523 || 64-52
|- style="background-color:#bbffbb"
| 117 || August 13 || Devil Rays || 3-1 || Loaiza (6-7) || Corcoran (4-4) || Street (29) || 28,692 || 65-52
|- style="background-color:#bbffbb"
| 118 || August 14 || Mariners || 5-4 || Kennedy (3-0) || Soriano (1-2) || Duchscherer (3) || 21,859 || 66-52
|- style="background-color:#bbffbb"
| 119 || August 15 || Mariners || 11-2 || Saarloos (5-6) || Piñeiro (7-11) || – || 23,726 || 67-52
|- style="background-color:#bbffbb"
| 120 || August 16 || Mariners || 4-0 || Haren (11-9) || Meche (9-8) || – || 34,077 || 68-52
|- style="background-color:#ffbbbb"
| 121 || August 18|| @ Royals || 1-7 || Hudson (6-4) || Blanton (13-10) || – || n/a || 68-53
|- style="background-color:#ffbbbb"
| 122 || August 18 || @ Royals || 3-5 || Burgos (3-5) || Street (4-4) || Nelson (2) || 23,952 || 68-54
|- style="background-color:#bbffbb"
| 123 || August 19 || @ Royals || 7-2 || Zito (13-8) || Redman (7-8) || – || 30,810 || 69-54
|- style="background-color:#bbffbb"
| 124 || August 20 || @ Royals || 6-4 || Saarloos (6-6) || Hernández (3-8) || – || 16,592 || 70-54
|- style="background-color:#bbffbb"
| 125 || August 21 || @ Blue Jays || 12-10 || Haren (12-9) || League (0-1) || Duchscherer (4) || 28,280 || 71-54
|- style="background-color:#ffbbbb"
| 126 || August 22 || @ Blue Jays || 3-4 || Burnett (6-5) || Halsey (3-4) || Ryan (28) || 30,071 || 71-55
|- style="background-color:#bbffbb"
| 127 || August 23 || @ Blue Jays || 6-0 || Loaiza (7-7) || Chacín (6-3) || – || 32,516 || 72-55
|- style="background-color:#bbffbb"
| 128 || August 25 || @ Rangers || 9-3 || Zito (14-8) || Vólquez (1-3) || – || 31,178 || 73-55
|- style="background-color:#bbffbb"
| 129 || August 26 || @ Rangers || 5-3 || Blanton (14-10) || Eaton (3-4) || Duchscherer (5) || 37,752 || 74-55
|- style="background-color:#ffbbbb"
| 130 || August 27 || @ Rangers || 0-3 || Padilla (13-8) || Haren (12-10) || Otsuka (28) || 25,708 || 74-56
|- style="background-color:#bbffbb"
| 131 || August 28 || Red Sox || 9-0 || Loaiza (8-7) || Gabbard (0-3) || – || 30,159 || 75-56
|- style="background-color:#bbffbb"
| 132 || August 29 || Red Sox || 2-1 || Saarloos (7-6) || Beckett (14-9) || Duchscherer (6) || 30,517 || 76-56
|- style="background-color:#bbffbb"
| 133 || August 30 || Red Sox || 7-2 || Zito (15-8) || Schilling (14-7) || – || 31,073 || 77-56

|- style="background-color:#bbffbb"
| 134 || September 1 || Orioles || 5-4 || Halsey (4-4) || Williams (2-4) || Duchscherer (7) || 31,179 || 78-56
|- style="background-color:#ffbbbb"
| 135 || September 2 || Orioles || 5-6 || Loewen (5-4) || Haren (12-11) || Ray (31) || 24,383 || 78-57
|- style="background-color:#bbffbb"
| 136 || September 3 || Orioles || 10-1 || Loaiza (9-7) || Penn (0-1) || – || 26,280 || 79-57
|- style="background-color:#ffbbbb"
| 137 || September 4 || Rangers || 1-8 || Tejeda (4-3) || Zito (15-9) || – || 23,949 || 79-58
|- style="background-color:#ffbbbb"
| 138 || September 5 || Rangers || 4-5 || Eaton (5-4) || Saarloos (7-7) || Otsuka (31) || 27,225 || 79-59
|- style="background-color:#bbffbb"
| 139 || September 6 || Rangers || 9-6 || Blanton (15-10) || Rupe (0-1) || Duchscherer (8) || 17,838 || 80-59
|- style="background-color:#bbffbb"
| 140 || September 8 || @ Devil Rays || 8-6 || Haren (13-11) || Shields (6-7) || Street (30) || 12,821 || 81-59
|- style="background-color:#ffbbbb"
| 141 || September 9 || @ Devil Rays || 6-9 || Miceli (1-1) || Loaiza (9-8) || McClung (6) || 22,016 || 81-60
|- style="background-color:#bbffbb"
| 142 || September 10 || @ Devil Rays || 9-7 || Kennedy (4-0) || Camp (7-3) || Street (31) || 16,791 || 82-60
|- style="background-color:#ffbbbb"
| 143 || September 11 || @ Twins || 4-9 || Silva (9-13) || Blanton (15-11) || Nathan (31) || 15,728 || 82-61
|- style="background-color:#ffbbbb"
| 144 || September 12 || @ Twins || 5-7 || Reyes (5-0) || Kennedy (4-1) || Nathan (32) || 20,991 || 82-62
|- style="background-color:#bbffbb"
| 145 || September 13 || @ Twins || 1-0 || Haren (14-11) || Garza (1-5) || Street (32) || 18,902 || 83-62
|- style="background-color:#bbffbb"
| 146 || September 15 || White Sox || 4-2 || Loaiza (10-8) || Garland (17-5) || Street (33) || 26,809 || 84-62
|- style="background-color:#bbffbb"
| 147 || September 16 || White Sox || 7-4 || Zito (16-9) || Thornton (5-3) || Street (34) || 32,169 || 85-62
|- style="background-color:#bbffbb"
| 148 || September 17 || White Sox || 5-4 || Blanton (16-11) || Contreras (13-8) || Duchscherer (9) || 28,806 || 86-62
|- style="background-color:#ffbbbb"
| 149 || September 18 || Indians || 2-7 || Westbrook (13-10) || Haren (14-12) || – || 17,352 || 86-63
|- style="background-color:#bbffbb"
| 150 || September 19 || Indians || 7-3 || Gaudin (2-2) || Lee (12-11) || – || 15,866 || 87-63
|- style="background-color:#bbffbb"
| 151 || September 20 || Indians || 4-3 || Loaiza (11-8) || Cabrera (3-3) || Street (35) || 25,131 || 88-63
|- style="background-color:#bbffbb"
| 152 || September 21 || Indians || 7-4 || Gaudin (3-2) || Sabathia (11-11) || Street (36) || 20,452 || 89-63
|- style="background-color:#bbffbb"
| 153 || September 22 || Angels || 5-4 (12) || Halsey (5-4) || F. Rodríguez (2-3) || – || 35,077 || 90-63
|- style="background-color:#ffbbbb"
| 154 || September 23 || Angels || 2-6 || Lackey (12-11) || Blanton (16-12) || – || 34,077 || 90-64
|- style="background-color:#ffbbbb"
| 155 || September 24 || Angels || 1-7 || Santana (15-8) || Haren (14-13) || – || 34,077 || 90-65
|- style="background-color:#ffbbbb"
| 156 || September 25 || @ Mariners || 9-10 (10) || Putz (4-1) || Calero (3-2) || – || 20,982 || 90-66
|- style="background-color:#bbffbb"
| 157 || September 26 || @ Mariners || 12-3 || Harden (4-0) || Woods (6-4) || – || 19,604 || 91-66
|- style="background-color:#bbffbb"
| 158 || September 27 || @ Mariners || 7-6 (10) || Witasick (1-0) || Sherrill (2-4) || Street (37) || 23,421 || 92-66
|- style="background-color:#ffbbbb"
| 159 || September 28 || @ Angels || 0-2 || Lackey (13-11) || Zito (16-10) || F. Rodríguez (46) || 41,944 || 92-67
|- style="background-color:#ffbbbb"
| 160 || September 29 || @ Angels || 0-6 || Santana (16-8) || Loaiza (11-9) || – || 43,948 || 92-68
|- style="background-color:#ffbbbb"
| 161 || September 30 || @ Angels || 6-7 || Carrasco (7-3) || Flores (1-2) || F. Rodríguez (47) || 43,944 || 92-69

|- style="background-color:#bbffbb"
| 162 || October 1 || @ Angels || 11-10 || Gaudin (4-2) || Bootcheck (0-1) || Flores (1) || 44,107 || 93-69

Roster

Player stats

Batting

Starters by position
Note: Pos = Position; G = Games played; AB = At bats; H = Hits; Avg. = Batting average; HR = Home runs; RBI = Runs batted in

Other batters
Note: G = Games played; AB = At bats; H = Hits; Avg. = Batting average; HR = Home runs; RBI = Runs batted in

Pitching

Starting pitchers
Note: G = Games pitched; IP = Innings pitched; W = Wins; L = Losses; ERA = Earned run average; SO = Strikeouts

Other pitchers 
Note: G = Games pitched; IP = Innings pitched; W = Wins; L = Losses; ERA = Earned run average; SO = Strikeouts

Relief pitchers 
Note: G = Games pitched; W = Wins; L = Losses; SV = Saves; ERA = Earned run average; SO = Strikeouts

Farm system

References

2006 Oakland Athletics team page at Baseball Reference
2006 Oakland Athletics team page at www.baseball-almanac.com

Oakland Athletics seasons
Oakland Athletics
American League West champion seasons
Oakland Athletics Season
Oak